Johnny Petersen (born 27 November 1947) is a Danish football manager and former player who most recently was caretaker manager of Akademisk Boldklub. As a player, he represented Akademisk Boldklub and B 93 in his native country and FC St. Pauli in Germany. He played three games for the Denmark national team. As a coach, he most notably coached Herfølge BK and FC Nordsjælland in the Danish Superliga.

External links
 
 

1947 births
Living people
Association football midfielders
Danish men's footballers
Denmark international footballers
Akademisk Boldklub players
FC St. Pauli players
Boldklubben af 1893 players
Danish football managers
Boldklubben af 1893 managers
Akademisk Boldklub managers
Boldklubben Frem managers
Herfølge Boldklub managers
FC Nordsjælland managers
Danish Superliga managers
Ballerup-Skovlunde Fodbold managers
Hellerup IK managers
Danish 1st Division managers
Danish expatriate men's footballers